J.P. Morgan Saves the Nation is a 1995 musical with a book by Jeffrey M. Jones and music by Jonathan Larson.

Jonathan Larson was invited to compose music for En Garde Arts‘s production of Jeffrey M. Jones’ J.P. Morgan Saves the Nation, a postmodern work detailing the life of financier J. P. Morgan. Larson was called in as a replacement as Jones' long-time collaborator, Dan Moses Schreier, dropped out, suggested by artistic director Annie Hamburger after hearing a recording of the workshop production of Rent at New York Theatre Workshop.

Development 
The score for J.P. Morgan contains "Larson’s musical recipe" including classic composer John Philip Sousa, soul, Seattle-inspired music, and electric-guitar-heavy grunge. Meanwhile, Entertainment Weekly described it as a "ragtime-to-rock satire".

The show was staged at the "pointedly appropriate setting" of the Federal Hall National Memorial on Wall Street, which was across the street from the Morgan Guaranty Trust Company, founded by the titular character.

Critical reception 
According to The Atlantic, J.P. Morgan Saves the Nation, along with Larson's other shows Superbia and Tick, Tick... Boom!, "opened and closed quickly, in out-of-the-way venues". The New York Times noted the piece's "intricate, even esoteric book...obviously the product of many hours of library research" and "peppy score in a post-modernist medley of musical voices".

References 

1995 musicals